John Howard Morrow Sr. (February 5, 1910 – January 11, 2000) was an American diplomat.  In 1959, President Dwight Eisenhower appointed him the first ambassador to independent Guinea.  He became the first representative of the United States in the United Nations Educational, Scientific and Cultural Organization (UNESCO) during the administration of President John F. Kennedy. At the time, he was one of a small number of African American high-level diplomats.

Personal life
Born in Hackensack, New Jersey, Morrow graduated from Rutgers University in 1931 and earned graduate degrees from the University of Pennsylvania, a master's in 1942 and a Ph.D. in 1952.

He was the brother of E. Frederic Morrow, the first African-American to hold an executive position in the White House; and Nellie Morrow Parker, the first African-American public school teacher in Bergen County, New Jersey.  His son, John H. Morrow Jr., is a professor of history at the University of Georgia. His daughter is Jean Rowena.

Morrow was a member of Alpha Phi Alpha fraternity.

Writing career
His memoir is entitled First American Ambassador to Guinea (1959-1961).

References

1910 births
2000 deaths
Ambassadors of the United States to Guinea
Permanent Delegates of the United States to UNESCO
African-American diplomats
People from Hackensack, New Jersey
Rutgers University alumni
University of Pennsylvania alumni
20th-century African-American people
20th-century American diplomats